The 2018 Waratah Cup was the 16th season of Football NSW's knockout competition. The Preliminary Rounds are now a part of the FFA Cup competition. 
The 5 winners from the FFA Cup preliminary Seventh Round qualified for the Waratah Cup.

The Cup was won by APIA Leichhardt Tigers, their 5th title.

Format

Preliminary rounds

New South Wales clubs, other than Northern NSW and A-League clubs, participate in the FFA Cup via the preliminary rounds. The competition is for all Senior Men's teams of the National Premier Leagues NSW, NPL 2, NPL 3, NSW State League, as well as Association teams which applied to participate.

A total of 169 clubs entered into the competition, and the five qualifiers were:

Elimination Playoff 

Two of the qualifiers played-off to reduce the remaining teams to 4 teams, with the match played on 13 June.

Semi finals

A total of 4 teams took part in this stage of the competition, with the matches played on 27 June.

Grand final

References

Waratah Cup
Waratah Cup